Oleg Garin may refer to:

 Oleg Garin (footballer) (born 1966), Russian professional football coach and former player 
 Oleg Garin (politician) (born 1973), Russian politician and motocross rider